Falkirk High School is a high school located in Falkirk, Stirlingshire that was founded in 1886.

It is a non-denominational six-year fully comprehensive school, situated approximately one mile from the centre of the town. It serves a widespread catchment area and has eight associated primary schools: Bainsford, Bantaskin, Carmuirs, Comely Park, Easter Carmuirs, Langlees,  Limerigg and Slamannan Primary Schools.

There are four houses – Campbell (Red), Robertson (Yellow), Cameron (Green) and Mackay (Blue), which are named after the first four rectors of the school.

Roll
 
2004/2005 1153
2010/2011 1058

Notable former teachers
 James Martin, Scottish Public Services Ombudsman since 2009 (taught from 1975 to 1979)
 Alexander Durie Russell FRSE (d.1955) maths teacher at Falkirk

Notable alumni

 Craigie Aitchison, Lord Aitchison, Labour MP from 1929 to 1933 for Kilmarnock
 novelist Alan 'Alvin' Bissett
 Dame Elizabeth Blackadder, Painter and Limner
 Rev Dr John Urquhart Cameron, athlete, theologian, journalist
 Prof George Stuart Gordon, Vice-Chancellor of the University of Oxford from 1938 to 1941, President from 1928 to 1942 of Magdalen College, Oxford, and Professor of English at the University of Leeds
 Ian Harley, chief executive officer, Abbey National Bank from 1998 to 2002
 David Marshall, Labour MP from 2005 to 2008 for Glasgow East, and from 1979 to 2005 for Glasgow Shettleston
 Prof Gordon Marshall CBE, Vice-Chancellor from 2003 to 2011 of the University of Reading, and chairman since 2007 of the Higher Education Statistics Agency
 Donald Shaw Ramsay, was a Scottish bagpiper. Qualified as a pipe major in the British Army, he led the Edinburgh City Police Pipe Band to victory at the World Championships twice and was also leader of the all-star Invergordon Distillery Pipe Band during its four years of existence.

References

External links
 Falkirk High School's page on Scottish Schools Online
https://www.falkirk.falkirk.sch.uk/

Secondary schools in Falkirk (council area)
Buildings and structures in Falkirk
1886 establishments in Scotland
Educational institutions established in 1886